Miss Universe 1966, the 15th Miss Universe pageant, was held on 16 July 1966 at the Miami Beach Auditorium in Miami Beach, Florida, United States. Apasra Hongsakula of Thailand crowned her successor Margareta Arvidsson of Sweden at the end of the event.

Results

Placements

Contestants

  - Elba Beatriz Baso
  - Sandra Fang
  - Renate Polacek
  - Sandra Zoe Jarrett
  - Mireille De Man
  - Marie Clarissa Trott
  - María Elena Borda
  - Ana Cristina Ridzi †
  - Marjorie Anne Schofield
  - Lorraine Roosmalecocq
  - Stella Dunnage Roberts
  - Edna Margarita Rudd Lucena
  - María Virginia Oreamuno
  - Lesbia Murrieta
  - Elizabeth Sanchez
  - Gitte Fleinert
  - Martha Cecilia Andrade Alominia
  - Janice Carol Whiteman
  - Satu Charlotta Ostring
  - Michele Boule
  - Marion Heinrich
  - Katia Balafouta
  - Barbara Jean Perez
  - Umblita Van Sluytman †
  - Margo Isabelle Domen
  - Erla Traustadóttir
  - Yasmin Daji
  - Gladys Waller
  - Aviva Israeli
  - Paola Bossalino
  - Beverly Savory
  - Atsumi Ikeno
  - Yolla Georges Harb
  - Gigi Antinori
  - Helen Lee
  - Joelle Lesage
  - Heather Gettings
  - Siri Gro Nilsen
 Okinawa - Yoneko Kiyan
  - Dionisia Broce
  - Mirtha Martínez Sarubbi
  - Madeleine Hartog-Bel
  - Maria Clarinda Garces Soriano
  - Carol Barajadas
  - Linda Ann Lees
  - Margaret Van Meel
  - Lynn Carol De Jager
  - Yoon Gui-young
  - Paquita Torres Pérez
  - Joyce Magda Leysner
  - Margareta Arvidsson
  - Hedy Frick
  - Cheranand Savetanand
  - Kathleen Hares
  - Nilgun Arslaner
  - Maria Judith Remenyi
  - Magally Beatriz Castro Egui
  - Christine Heller

Notes

Awards
  - Miss Amity (Elizabeth Sanchez)
  - Miss Amity (Paquita Torres)
  - Miss Photogenic (Margareta Arvidsson)
  - Best National Costume (Aviva Israeli)

General References

References

1966
1966 beauty pageants
1966 in Florida
Beauty pageants in the United States
Events in Miami Beach, Florida
July 1966 events in the United States